Badminton at the 2010 Asian Para Games were held in Tianhe Gymnasium from December 13 to December 18. There were 13 gold medals in this sport.

Medal summary

Medal table
Retrieved from Asian Para Games 2010 Official Website.

Events

Results

Men's singles - BMSTL1

Men's singles - BMSTL2

Men's singles - BMSTL3

Men's singles - BMSTU4

Men's singles - BMSTU5

Men's singles - BMW2

Men's singles - BMW3

Men's doubles - BMSTL1-3

Men's doubles - BMSTU4-5

Women's singles - BMSTL2

Women's singles - BMSTL3

Women's singles - BMSTU5

Women's singles - BMW3

References

2010 Asian Para Games events
Asian Para Games
Badminton at the Asian Para Games